The Castle of Almourol is a medieval castle atop the islet of Almourol in the middle of the Tagus River, located in the civil parish of Praia do Ribatejo,  from the municipal seat of Vila Nova da Barquinha, in Portugal's Centre Region. The castle was part of the defensive line controlled by the Knights Templar, and a stronghold used during the Portuguese Reconquista.

History
  

It is believed that the castle was constructed on the site of a primitive Lusitanian castro that was later conquered by the Romans during the 1st century B.C.E. It was later remodeled by successive invading forces, including the Alans, Visigoths and the Andalusian Berbers, although it is unclear when the actual castle was established. In excavations carried out in the interior and exterior enclosures, various vestiges of Roman occupation were discovered including coins, millennium markers, and Roman foundations, while medieval remnants such as medallions and two marble columns were also discovered in the castle's vicinity.

The castle of Almourol is one of the more emblematic medieval military monuments of the Reconquista, and one of the best representations of the influence of the Knights Templar in Portugal. When it was conquered in 1129 by forces loyal to the Portuguese nobility, it was known as Almorolan, and placed in the trust of Gualdim Pais, the master of the Knights Templar in Portugal, who subsequently rebuilt the structure. The structure was reconstructed, starting in 1171 (from an inscription over the principal gate) and restored during the subsequent reigns.

Losing its strategic place, it was abandoned, resulting in its fall into ruins. In the 19th century, it was "reinvented" by idealistic romanticists, which eventually led to interventions in the 1940s and 1950s, and its adaption as an Official Residence of the Portuguese Republic. During this period, there were many restorations that transformed the physical appearance of the structure, including the addition of crenellations and bartizans.

The DGMEN - Direcção-Geral dos Edifícios e Monumentos Nacionais (Directorate-General of Buildings and National Monuments), the forerunner of the IGESPAR, first intervened on the site in 1939, through the construction of the chemin de ronde in masonry, including reinforced concrete; the dismantlement and reconstruction of the corner of the keep; repair and consolidation of the battlements, including the demolition of the tower's allure, reconstruction of a brick vault under the existing; and reconstruction of the pavement in small stone.

Around 1940–1950, the spaces were adapted for its use as an official residence of the Portuguese Republic. At the end of this short term, the building's furniture was acquired by the Commission for Furniture Acquisition in 1955, while an electrical system was installed.

Between 1958 and 1959, there was some consolidation of the keep with concrete straps, a project to diminish the permeability of the courtyard and reconstruction of the interior walls of the tower by the Escola Prática de Engenharia (Practical School of Engineering), as well as the reconstruction of a door that included doorposts and lintels. In subsequent years, other projects followed: in 1959, the façade of one section of wall was repaired; in 1960, with the conclusion of the repairs to the exterior walls, the pavement and road access was improved by the Direcção da Arma de Engenharia de Tancos (Tancos Directorate for the Engineering Arm). A roadway that skirted the islet from the quay to the southern end of the castle was reconstructed by the Serviços de Engenharia do Estado Maior do Exército (Army General Staff Engineering Services).

By 1996, the walls had been repaired, sections of the keep were preserved, and the pavement in the castle restored.

21st century and tourism 

Owing to water infiltration, the castle began to show some signs of degradation by 2004, including a few of the exterior walls.

Although access to the Portuguese National Monument and fluvial islet is free, visitors to the structure must pay for an inexpensive boat-ride across the river, the only way for visitors to reach the castle.

Architecture

The castle has an irregular rectangular plan consisting of two enclosures: an exterior lower level faces upstream with a traitors' gate and walls reinforced by nine tall circular towers; while the interior enclosure, located at a higher elevation, has walls accessible by the main gate to the main keep. The keep is three stories tall, and includes the original pads that supported the main truss. The remaining sentry towers are irregular, owing to the irregular terrain. The keep is actually an innovation at this castle, appearing in the 12th century after the Castle of Tomar, the principal defensive redoubt of the Templars in Portugal. Similarly, the watchtowers were innovations brought into the western Iberian peninsula by the Templars, and applied in Almourol.

The interior is bisected by several masonry doorways that link the different parts of the castle. Two inscription stones mark the castle's history and its re-edification by Gualdim Pais (over the main gate), as well as its Christian history (from the cross carved into the space above an open window in the keep).

References
Notes

Sources

See also
 How to visit?  (English page)
 Castles in Portugal
 Monuments of Portugal
 History of Portugal
 Order of Christ

Almourol
Almourol
Castle Almourol
Knights Templar